Thekkan Kattu is a 1973 Indian Malayalam film, directed by J. Sasikumar and produced by R. S. Prabhu. The film stars Madhu, Sharada, Sukumari and KPAC Lalitha in the lead roles. The film had musical score by A. T. Ummer.

Cast
 
Madhu as Babu 
Sharada as Sosamma 
Sukumari as Shyamala Khanna 
KPAC Lalitha as Gowri 
Adoor Bhasi as Gopalan 
Sujatha as Annakkutty
Jose Prakash as Annakkutty's Husband 
Sankaradi as Gowri's Father 
Paul Vengola 
Adoor Bhavani as Babu's Mother 
Kaduvakulam Antony as Kunjeli's Husband 
Kottarakkara Sreedharan Nair as Chacko 
Kunchan 
Meena as Sosamma's Mother 
Rajakokila as Shyamala Khanna's Daughter 
S. P. Pillai as Babu's Father 
Master Raghu

Soundtrack

References

External links
 

1973 films
1970s Malayalam-language films
Films directed by J. Sasikumar